Tithal Beach is located in Valsad on the coast of Arabian Sea in the state of Gujarat.The sand of the beach is Black sand. Tithal beach is one of the popular tourist attractions of Valsad district and Gujarat. Recently, Aquatic sports have been started at the beach like Speed boats, Jet Ski etc. Tithal Beach also has other tourist attractions near the shore of the beach like Shree Shirdi Saibaba Temple, Shree Swaminarayan Temple.

Tithal Beach Festival and International Kite Festival are also organized on the shore of the beach because of its popularity.

References

See Also 

 Shivrajpur beach 
 Dandi Beach
 Gopnath Beach
 Dumas Beach

Beaches of Gujarat
Tourist attractions in Valsad district
Black sand beaches